Tuktarovo (Tuqtar) is a rural locality (a village) in Volkovsky Selsoviet, Blagoveshchensky District, Bashkortostan, Russia. The population was 172 as of 2010. There are 2 streets.

Geography 
Tuktarovo is located 33 km east of Blagoveshchensk (the district's administrative centre) by road. Preobrazhenskoye is the nearest rural locality.

References 

Rural localities in Blagoveshchensky District